Tea Alagic (born 1972) is a Bosnian-American stage director and creator of devised theater.  Her best-known productions include the premiere of The Brothers Size by Tarell Alvin McCraney, the U.S premieres of plays by Austrian playwright and Nobel Laureate, Elfriede Jelinek and the revival of Passing Strange by Stew and Heidi Rodewald.

Biography

Early life
Alagic was born in Mostar, Bosnia and Herzegovina, in 1972. She made her acting debut at 14 at the Mostar Youth Theatre, where she performed until she left the city in 1992 because of the Bosnian War.

For the next five years, Alagic lived in Munich, Germany and Prague, Czech Republic.  She attended Charles University Academy of Performing Arts in Prague and obtained her BFA in Acting in 1997.

Acting career
After graduating, she began a career as an actor and a creator of devised work, working across Europe and North America.  During this time, she worked with leading avant-garde theatre directors: Ariane Mnouchkine, Simon McBurney, Robert Lepage and Richard Foreman.

From 1998 to 2001, Alagic worked as a co-creator and performer in Ex-Machina's Geometry of Miracles, directed by Robert Lepage, a performance piece based on the life and work of Frank Lloyd Wright. Alagic performed in the full world tour.

Alagic moved in 2003 to New York City, where she performed in Richard Foreman's Panic (How to Be Happy) with the Ontological-Hysteric Theater.  She performed in the international tour of Panic, which was presented at festivals in Vienna and Zurich.

Directing career
In New York City, Alagic also worked as a director and deviser, creating ensemble and solo shows, including The Filament Cycle, One Day in Moscow, and Men Have Called Me Mad.

Alagic was accepted to Directing program at Yale Drama School in 2004, and obtained her MFA in Directing in 2007. While at Yale, Alagic collaborated with Tarell Alvin McCraney, Amy Herzog, Lauren Feldman, Dorothy Fortenberry, Gonzalo Rodriguez Risco, Jennifer Tuckett, Matt Moses and Mattie Brickman. In 2006, for her final thesis project, Alagic wrote and directed the play Zero Hour, based on her personal experience in the Bosnian War.

Alagic collaborated with Daniel Alexander Jones on his play Book of Daniel in Austin, Texas.

In 2006, Alagic returned to New York City with the world premiere of The Brothers Size by Tarell Alvin McCraney. She directed the New York premiere at the Public Theatre's Under the Radar Festival in 2007, which was followed by a full production at the Public (co-produced by the Foundry Theatre). "The Brothers Size" was nominated for Best Play at The Lucille Lortel Award in 2008. She has directed productions of Brothers Size at the Old Globe (San Diego, CA), the Studio Theatre (Washington, DC), the Abbey Theatre (Dublin, Ireland), and the Actor's Theatre of Louisville (Louisville, KY).

In 2013, Alagic directed the North American premiere of Jackie by the Nobel Laureate, Elfriede Jelinek. The show was nominated for The Lucile Lortel Award for the Best Solo Show and Best Sound Design. Alagic and Jelinek continue to collaborate.  Alagic is currently the only director to stage Jelinek's works in the United States.

She currently teaches theater directing at The New School for Drama in New York where she serves as Department Head of Directing.

Personal life
Tea Alagic lives in NYC and she is married to photographer Slaven Vlasic. They have a child.

Work

Directing credits
 2018: Passing Strange by Stew and Heidi Rodewald, The Whilma Theater, Philadelphia, PA
 2018: Piano Slam 10, Adrienne Arsht Center for the Performing Arts, Miami, FL
 2017: Constellations by Nick Payne, The Whilma Theater, Philadelphia, PA
 2016: Passover by Antoinette Nwandu, Cherry Lane Theatre Mentor Project
 2015: Agamemnon by Anne Carson, Fordham University
 2015: Washeteria by Charise Castro Smith, SohoRep
 2015: The Brothers Size by Tarell Alvin McCraney, Actors Theatre of Louisville, Kentucky
 2014: 4,000 Miles by Amy Herzog, Asolo Rep, Sarasota FL
 2013: Romeo and Juliet by William Shakespeare, Classic Stage Company
 2013: Jackie by Elfriede Jelinek, Women's Project, City Center Stage II
 2013: Venus in Fur by David Ives, Asolo Rep, Sarasota FL
 2013: The Brothers Size by Tarell Alvin McCraney, The Old Globe, San Diego, CAP
 2012: Petty Harbour by Martyna Majok, Carlotta Festival YSD
 2012: Man of La Mancha by Dale Wasserman, The Burning Coal Theater, NC
 2011: Lidless by Frances YaChu Cowing, Soho Rep (produced by Page 73)
 2011: Waking Up by Cori Thomas, Ensemble Studio Theater
 2011:  by Naomi Iizuka, Hispanic Cultural Center, Albuquerque
 2009: Binibon by Jack Womack, The Kitchen
 2009: Events with Life's Leftovers by Alberto Vilarreal Diaz, Dramafest, Mexico City
 2009: The Marriage of Maria Braun by Rainer Werner Fassbinder, Z/K/M, Zagreb
 2008: The Brothers Size by Tarell McCraney, The Studio Theater, Washington, DC
 2008: Aliens with Extraordinary Skills by Saviana Stanescu, The Women's Project
 2008: The Brothers Size by Tarell McCraney, The Abbey Theater, Dublin
 2007: The Brothers Size by Tarell McCraney, The Public Theater
 2006: Zero Hour by Tea Alagic, Yale School of Drama, New Haven
 2005: Woyzeck by Georg Büchner,  Ensemble Company for the Performing Arts (ECPA),New Haven
 2005: Baal by Bertolt Brecht, ECPA, New Haven
 2001: The Filament Cycle by Tea Alagic,  LaMama, E.T.C.

Acting credits
 2003: Panic (How to Be Happy), dir. Richard Foreman, Ontological Theater
 2002: P = 3.14, dir. Yoshiko Chuma, La Mama E.T.C.
 2002: Al-Hamlet Summit, dir. Sulayman Al-Bassam, Edinburgh Fringe
 2001: Life with an Idiot, dir. Ben Harrison, Gate Theatre, London
 1998–2000: The Geometry of Miracles, dir. Robert Lepage, Ex Machina
 1997: Kafka's Amerika, dir. Patrick Kealy, Southwark Playhouse, London

Awards and nominations
 2008: The Lucille Lortel Award Nomination for Best Play – The Brothers Size
 2013: The Lucile Lortel Award Nomination for Best Solo Show and Best Sound – Jackie
 2002: Edinburgh International Fringe First Award – Al-Hamlet Summit

References

1972 births
Living people
Bosnia and Herzegovina theatre directors
American theatre directors
Women theatre directors
People from Mostar
Charles University alumni